Robert Bouloux (born 20 May 1947) is a French former cyclist. His sporting career began with ACBB Paris.  He competed in the team time trial at the 1968 Summer Olympics.

References

External links
 

1947 births
Living people
French male cyclists
Olympic cyclists of France
Cyclists at the 1968 Summer Olympics
Sportspeople from Côtes-d'Armor
Cyclists from Brittany